Tong Wai Ki (March 1939 – 15 January 2022) was a Hong Kong Taoist priest and politician.

He served in the Chinese People's Political Consultative Conference from 2008 to 2013. He died on 15 January 2022, at the age of 82.

References

1939 births
2022 deaths
Hong Kong politicians
Members of the 11th Chinese People's Political Consultative Conference
Recipients of the Bronze Bauhinia Star